Bulat is a name found in Europe, of Turkish and Iranian origin.

Bulat may also refer to:

 Bulat steel, an alloy
 BM Bulat, T-64 main battle tank modernized in Ukraine
 BULATS or Business Language Testing Service for English as a second or foreign language
 SBA-60K2 Bulat, a Russian armored personnel carrier